Twilo was an American nightclub in operation from 1995 to 2001 in New York City and from 2006 to 2007 in Miami. The New York location at 530 West 27th Street in the Chelsea neighborhood of Manhattan regularly attracted a crowd of thousands to its warehouse-like dance floor. Playing host to dozens of DJs from around the world, the club was important in popularizing international styles of house and trance music within the United States.

Club Nights 

Twilo usually kept at least one small room open most nights of the week, but the weekends were far busier. Friday nights saw a younger and alternative straight crowd. Twilo regularly featured prominent American and European DJs playing trance, techno, and house music. Sasha and John Digweed had a monthly residency at the club, playing the last Friday of every month. Early in 2001 after Sasha suffered an ear injury in a car accident and was unable to DJ, John Digweed played the entire 8 hour time slot by himself until the closing of the club in May. Other DJs would play frequently such as Paul van Dyk, Carl Cox, Robert Fauver, Richie Hawtin (aka Plastikman), Danny Tenaglia, Merritt, Jeff Mills, Steve Lawler, Paul Oakenfold, Pete Marvelous, Pete Tong, DJ Dan, and Sven Väth.

In 1996 Twilo’s Saturday night events were hosted by DJ Danny Tenaglia who’s residency would span years and change the lives of club goers who came from far and wide. And earned him the title of “the Dj’s Dj”. The competition with other superclubs like Tunnel which was down the street from Twilo: touting Junior Vasques as its homegrown resident.the Roxy, Twilo's Saturday nights were ostensibly gay-oriented but attracted some many straight partygoers. 

Twilo was also equipped with a state-of-the-art sound system known as Phazon. This sound system, originally built by Steve Dash, was at the time unique to the venue. The sound system at Twilo was highly regarded by patrons and DJs alike for its sound quality. Some DJs went as far as momentarily leaving the DJ booth to hear their favorite records on the dancefloor. After the closing of the club, the sound system was sold to Club Shelter.

John Digweed, on his Transitions radio show on September 4, 2009, played an hour from one of his sets at Twilo from January, 2001. He's quoted as saying, "I've dug into my vaults and I've found an hour from when I was playing at Twilo, that legendary club in New York City.  It was just under nine years ago that I recorded this set, and I've gotta say.. without a doubt.. my favorite club that I've ever played, in the world. Just unbelievable, those 5 years I've spent there alongside Sasha were just great, great time of my life, and the crowd that made those nights so special."  In the middle of the set Digweed is also quoted as saying: "It's definitely one of those legendary clubs that if you didn't get a chance to go, it was definitely a shame, because the sound system, the setup, the lighting, and the whole vibe was truly amazing."

Gallery

Closing 

Twilo had been under pressure to close from then-Mayor Rudy Giuliani ever since the launch of his controversial quality-of-life campaign. Still, the club managed to hold onto its cabaret license until early 2001, when a spate of previous allegations re-surfaced in connection with a claim by city authorities that the club had misused private ambulances to hide victims of drug overdoses. Club management claimed that the ambulance was obtained by recommendation of the city.

Several run-ins with New York city authorities starting in 1998 concerning drug-related incidents caused the city to block the club's re-application in October 2000 for a cabaret license, a requirement for all dancing venues in New York City. In July 2000 James Wiest, an undergraduate from Johns Hopkins University was found unconscious in a back room. He had allegedly been put into the lobby after passing out on the dance floor. He later died of a suspected drug overdose. The club was never charged in his death. A civil action was brought in the New York Supreme Court by Mr. Wiest's mother against the owner of Twilo and other defendants.  In denying certain defendants’ motion to dismiss various causes of action, the Appellate Division First Department wrote:

The decedent's illegal behavior pales in comparison to appellants' wrongdoing, which consisted of countenancing drug abuse on the premises and secreting stricken patrons, including the decedent on the night in question, in a back room, instructing appellants' personnel to refrain from calling an ambulance and misleading police officers responding to the scene, thus depriving these patrons of timely medical attention.

This was not the first fatal overdose associated with Twilo.

In June 1998 a 22 year old recent NYU graduate named Brigit Murray died from what first appeared to be a drug overdose at Twilo but was concluded by medical professionals to be an aneurysm triggered by first time ecstasy use. Friends of Brigit Murray had informed the police that while she had in fact visited the club earlier in the evening her death did not take place there. Almost 20 years later it was revealed by a close friend of Brigit's who was with her that night, that they did not actually purchase ecstasy at Twilo, but instead the narcotics were sent in the mail from a friend's cousin in Miami - completely absolving Twilo New York of any liability regarding Brigit's case. Another allegation was that undercover police during an eight-month period, also in 1998, had made 18 drug buys (of which two led to arrests). Daniel S. Connolly of the New York City Law Department stated: "There are a series of serious public-safety issues that are of grave concern [...] We believe we are able to convince the court that this is not a responsible organization that should continue to operate. The fact that people are dying inside of there [demonstrates that] there is a pattern of reckless disregard of the safety of the clientele." Twilo management on the other hand asserted that the club had done everything in its power to appease the city authorities even taking to extreme measures like hiring three undercover guards. It was apparently in connection with the accusations against the club for its lack of response to the previous drug incidents that the decision to retain EMT ambulances at the club throughout opening hours was made.

During the early hours of May 6, 2001, Twilo was raided and its occupants were evicted. The authorities cited the reason for the closing was an expired Certificate of Occupancy. The club remained closed due to its inability to fulfill the long list of the city's mandates and regulations. Twilo's sound system, disco ball and awning were sold online soon after, ending any speculation that it might reopen in the near future.

The building would be used as multiple different nightclubs over the years before eventually falling into disrepair. A decade after Twilo's closure, the disused warehouse found new use as the new home of the immersive theater play Sleep No More. Though renovated heavily to resemble the play's canon location the McKittrick Hotel, spaces in the building that are still recognizable from its Twilo days include the dance floor, renovated to resemble a ballroom, and the second floor bar, which reuses the counter to appear as the hotel lobby.

Twilo Miami 

On July 22, 2006, Twilo opened a location in the entertainment district of Miami, Florida. Their mainstay Saturday nights attracted a largely gay clientele, even though the club encouraged a mixed crowd. DJs such as Junior Vasquez, Peter Rauhofer, and Miami native Abel played on a consistent basis. Danny Tenaglia held a monthly residency at the venue on the second or third Friday of every month, depending on his touring and studio schedule. Like its New York predecessor, Twilo Miami was equipped with a custom Phazon sound system, with the club acting as an unofficial showroom for Phazon. State-of-the-art lighting walls manufactured by Element Labs bookended each side of the dancefloor, and were programmed and operated by veteran lighting director Drew Bongiorno. Due to economic pressures, Twilo Miami shut down in June 2007.

Musical Influence 
Simon Noble & Rowan Blades collaborated to produce several tracks under the guise 'Breeder'.  One of these tracks, named after the club is called 'Twilo Thunder' (Twilo's sound system was known for its thunderous bass, as well as its crystal clear mids and highs.)  The system would sometimes produce bass rumbles which would mimic thunderstorms, hence the name Twilo Thunder.  According to Noble: "As Breeder we tried to create peak-time progressive house floor-fillers, and our aim was to make them rock and be good enough so that Sasha and Digweed would play them. The first tunes we wrote were 'The Chain' and 'Twilo Thunder', we gave them directly to Sasha and John Digweed and for over a year, they played them around the world at clubs such as Twilo in New York and Tyrant in London."

There is also a song named West on 27th by Killahurtz created in homage to the club.

References

External links
 A Video of Steve Lawler playing the song "Musak (Steve Lawler Remix)" by Trisco at Twilo.
 http://www.facebook.com/pages/Twilo-New-York/123649204328286?fref=ts Dedicated Facebook page

1995 establishments in New York City
2001 disestablishments in New York (state)
2006 establishments in Florida
2007 disestablishments in Florida
Defunct LGBT drinking establishments in New York City
Defunct LGBT nightclubs in New York (state)
Electronic dance music venues
LGBT history in Florida
LGBT nightclubs in Florida
Nightclubs in Manhattan